Diethylethanolamine (DEAE) is a chemical compound with the molecular formula C6H15NO.  It is used as a precursor in the production of a variety of chemical commodities such as the local anesthetic procaine.  It can be reacted with 4-aminobenzoic acid to make procaine. DEAE can be used as a precursor for DEAE-cellulose resin, which is commonly used in ion exchange chromatography. DEAE can also be conveniently obtained from renewable sources. It is chemically stable and able to absorb carbon dioxide (CO2) from its surroundings. In solution, it can decrease the surface tension of water when the temperature is increased.

Applications
Diethylethanolamine is used as a corrosion inhibitor in steam and condensate lines by neutralizing carbonic acid and scavenging oxygen.

Preparation
Diethylethanolamine is prepared commercially by the reaction of diethylamine and ethylene oxide.

(C2H5)2NH + cyclo(CH2CH2)O  → (C2H5)2NCH2CH2OH
It is also possible to prepare it by the reaction of diethylamine and ethylene chlorohydrin.

Safety
Diethylethanolamine is an irritant to the eyes, skin, and respiratory system. The Occupational Safety and Health Administration and the National Institute for Occupational Safety and Health have set occupational exposure limits for workers handling the chemical at 10 ppm (50 mg/m3) over an eight-hour workday.

References

Diethylamino compounds
Primary alcohols
Ethanolamines